Chang Gyu-Cheol (also Jang Gyu-Cheol, ; born June 11, 1992 in Gyeonggi-do) is a South Korean swimmer, who specialized in butterfly events. In 2010, Chang edged out South Africa's Chad le Clos by 0.18 of a second to claim a gold medal in the 100 m butterfly at the first ever Summer Youth Olympics in Singapore, posting his personal best of 53.13. He also won a silver medal, as a member of the South Korean swimming team, in the men's medley relay at the 2010 Asian Games in Guangzhou, China.

Chang qualified for the men's 100 m butterfly at the 2012 Summer Olympics in London, by eclipsing a FINA B-standard entry time of 52.45 seconds. He challenged seven other swimmers on the third heat, including five-time Olympian Peter Mankoč of Slovenia, freestyle relay champion Clement Lefert of France, and former Olympic finalist Ryan Pini of Papua New Guinea. Chang raced to fifth place by a hundredth of a second (0.01) behind Pini in a time of 52.69 seconds. Chang failed to advance into the semifinals, as he placed twenty-sixth overall in the preliminary heats.

References

External links
NBC Olympics Profile
 

1992 births
Living people
Sportspeople from Gyeonggi Province
South Korean male butterfly swimmers
Swimmers at the 2010 Summer Youth Olympics
Swimmers at the 2012 Summer Olympics
Olympic swimmers of South Korea
Swimmers at the 2010 Asian Games
Swimmers at the 2014 Asian Games
Swimmers at the 2018 Asian Games
Asian Games silver medalists for South Korea
Asian Games medalists in swimming
Medalists at the 2010 Asian Games
21st-century South Korean people